The Cajun Crown is the name of the rivalry trophy between the Louisiana Ragin' Cajuns and the McNeese Cowboys.

History
The two teams have met 38 times on the football field, with McNeese currently holding a 20–16–2 edge in the all time series. Originally an annual series, the game has been less frequently played since McNeese moved from the NCAA's Division I-A to Division I-AA in 1982.

Game results

See also  
 List of NCAA college football rivalry games

References

College football rivalry trophies in the United States
Louisiana Ragin' Cajuns football
McNeese Cowboys football